Zorina is a 1949 Mexican drama film directed by Juan José Ortega and starring Rafael Baledón, Leonora Amar and Luis Aldás.

Cast
 Rafael Baledón as Teniente Javier Escandón  
 Leonora Amar as Zorina  
 Luis Aldás as Bardo  
 Patricia Morán as Rosa María  
 Dalia Íñiguez as Constanza 
 José Pulido as Arturo  
 Manuel R. Ojeda as General Rovira  
Luz Alba as Palmira  
 Eduardo Casado as Coronel Márquez  
 Carlos Villarías as Coronel Lemus  
 José Torvay as Sargento Rojas  
 Juan Pulido as Andrés del Villar  
 Emma Fink as Mariana  
 Ángel Di Stefani as Patriarca  
 Manuel Casanueva as Yanlío  
 Hernán Vera as Tabernero  
 Karol Vaida
 Jorge Arriaga as Maleante  
 Lidia Franco as Doña Gorgonia 
 Amelia Robert as Gitana

References

Bibliography 
 Rogelio Agrasánchez. Beauties of Mexican Cinema. Agrasanchez Film Archive, 2001.

External links 
 

1949 films
1949 drama films
Mexican drama films
1940s Spanish-language films
Films directed by Juan José Ortega
Mexican black-and-white films
1940s Mexican films